"Mamacita" (stylized in all caps) is a song recorded by American group Black Eyed Peas and Puerto Rican singer Ozuna. Filipina singer J. Rey Soul, who joined the group in 2018, is also credited as a lead artist. It was released as a single on April 10, 2020. Sampling Madonna's Latin pop song "La Isla Bonita" (1986), "Mamacita" was produced by group's member will.i.am and Johnny Goldstein. The accompanying music video was directed by Director X.

Charts

Weekly charts

Year-end charts

Certifications

Release history

See also
List of Billboard number-one Latin songs of 2020

References

External links
 

2020 songs
2020 singles
Black Eyed Peas songs
Songs written by will.i.am
Songs written by Madonna
Songs written by Patrick Leonard
Songs written by Bruce Gaitsch
Songs written by apl.de.ap
Songs written by Ozuna (singer)
Ultratop 50 Singles (Wallonia) number-one singles
Moombahton songs
Music videos directed by Director X